Hanna Marie Mack (June 2, 2001 – September 10, 2007) was a 6-year-old girl from Navarro Mills, Texas who was sexually assaulted and murdered by Shaun Earl Arender, then 19.

Case and initial findings
Mack was a first-grader at Blooming Grove Elementary School, at the time living with her mother and live-in boyfriend in the rural town of Navarro Mills in the Dallas-Fort Worth area, about 60 miles (roughly 100 km) south of Dallas, Texas. Arender resided within about a mile of Mack's home, and in the early morning of September 10, apparently amid use of marijuana and possibly other recreational drugs, entered Mack's home. She was found later in the morning around dawn, naked and hanging from a rafter in a garage; she had been molested, raped and strangled.

Investigation and conviction
Although suspicion at first centered on the live-in boyfriend of Hanna Mack's mother, DNA evidence from the girl's shirt was found to be a match for Shaun Earl Arender, who had a criminal record for other offenses including burglary and drug possession. Following his arrest, Arender implicated the boyfriend as having orchestrated the sequence of events by molesting and then choking Hanna, but due to insufficient evidence, he was not charged for the crime. Arender pleaded guilty and was sentenced to life in prison without parole.

References

External links
 Hanna Marie Mack, “Littlest Angels” (2012-09-16).

2007 deaths
2007 murders in the United States
Deaths by person in Texas
Female murder victims
Murdered American children
People murdered in Texas
Incidents of violence against girls
Sexual assaults in the United States
2007 in Texas